The Hampton Terrace Historic District, originally called the Lakewood Manor Subdivision, is a U.S. historic district located in the Old Seminole Heights neighborhood of Tampa, Florida. The district is roughly bounded by Hanna Avenue to the north, 15th Street to the east, Nebraska Avenue to the west, and Hillsborough Avenue to the south.  Hampton Terrace Historic District was so designated by its inclusion in the National Register of Historic Places on January 27, 1999.

The Hampton Terrace district encompasses , and the neighborhood's boundaries are Hanna Ave, 15th St, Hillsborough Ave, and Nebraska, and includes Lake Roberta.  The area contains about 470 contributing structures, all of which are private residences.  The structures are considered historically significant examples of residential styles like the bungalow, and architectural influences including American Craftsman Style.

References

External links
 Hillsborough County listings at National Register of Historic Places
 Map of Hampton Terrace Historic District
 Hampton Terrace community website Resources for residents since 2004
 Hampton TGerrace Historic District Map (Living Places.com)

Neighborhoods in Tampa, Florida
National Register of Historic Places in Tampa, Florida
Historic districts on the National Register of Historic Places in Florida
Bungalow architecture in Florida
Houses on the National Register of Historic Places in Hillsborough County, Florida
1999 establishments in Florida